Ward v. Tesco Stores Ltd. [1976] 1 WLR 810, is an English tort law case concerning the doctrine of res ipsa loquitur ("the thing speaks for itself"). It deals with the law of negligence and it set an important precedent in so called "trip and slip" cases which are a common occurrence.

Facts
The plaintiff slipped on some pink yoghurt in a Tesco store in Smithdown Road, Liverpool. It was not clear whether or not Tesco staff were to blame for the spillage. It could have been another customer, or the wind, or anything else. Spillages happened roughly 10 times a week and staff had standing orders to clean anything up straight away. As Lawton LJ observed in his judgment,

The trial judge had held in Mrs Ward's favour and she was awarded £137.50 in damages. Tesco appealed.

Judgment
It was held by a majority (Lawton LJ and Megaw LJ) that even though it could not be said exactly what happened, the pink yoghurt being spilled spoke for itself as to who was to blame. Tesco was required to pay compensation. The plaintiff did not need to prove how long the spill had been there, because the burden of proof was on Tesco. Lawton LJ's judgment explained the previous case law, starting with Richards v. WF White & Co. [1957] 1 Lloyd's Rep.

Dissent
Omrod LJ disagreed with Lawton LJ and Megaw LJ on the basis that Tesco did not seem to have been able to do anything to have prevented the accident. He argued that they did not fail to take reasonable care, and in his words, the accident "could clearly have happened no matter what degree of care these defendants had taken."

Notes

English tort case law
English occupier case law
Court of Appeal (England and Wales) cases
1976 in case law
1976 in British law
Tesco